Fourplay is the debut album by the American smooth jazz group Fourplay which was released in 1991. The group was originally composed by Bob James (keyboards), Lee Ritenour (guitars), Nathan East (bass) and Harvey Mason (drums). The album went to number 1 on the Contemporary Jazz charts, number 16 on the R&B charts and number 97 on the US Billboard 200. Since then the album went Gold according to the RIAA and has sold over 1 million copies worldwide.

Overview
With this debut LP Fourplay's lineup consisted of keyboardist Bob James, guitarist Lee Ritenour, bassist Nathan East and drummer Harvey Mason.

Track listing

Personnel 
Fourplay
 Bob James – Yamaha C7 MIDI grand piano, keyboards, synthesizers, programming 
 Lee Ritenour – electric guitars, classical guitars, guitar synthesizer
 Nathan East – 5-string bass, 6-string bass, backing vocals (6)
 Harvey Mason – drums

Additional musicians
 Harvey Mason Jr. – synthesizer programming, computer programming 
 El DeBarge – lead and backing vocals (6)
 Darryl DeBarge – backing vocals (6)
 Patti LaBelle – backing vocals (6), BGV arrangements (6)
 Philip Bailey – backing vocals (11)

Production 
 Fourplay – producers 
 Bob James – executive producer 
 Don Murray – recording, mixing 
 Geoff Gillette – additional recording
 Khaliq Glover – additional recording 
 Femi Jiya – additional recording 
 Mike Kloster – assistant engineer
 Paul May – assistant engineer
 Clif Norrell – assistant engineer
 Harvey Mason Jr. – technical assistance 
 Robert Vosgien – digital editing 
 Wally Traugott – mastering at Capitol Mastering (Hollywood, California).
 Debra Johnson – production coordinator 
 Kim Champagne – art direction 
 Leslie Wintner – design 
 Stuart Watson – photography 
 O'Brien and Schridde – band photography

Track information and credits adapted from AllMusic

Charts

Weekly charts

Year-end charts

References

Fourplay albums
1991 debut albums
Warner Records albums